Anisaedus is a genus of palp-footed spiders that was first described by Eugène Louis Simon in 1893.

Species
 it contains six species, found in Africa, Argentina, Chile, Peru, and Ecuador:
Anisaedus aethiopicus Tullgren, 1910 – Tanzania
Anisaedus gaujoni Simon, 1893 (type) – Ecuador, Peru
Anisaedus levii Chickering, 1966 – Africa
Anisaedus pellucidas Platnick, 1975 – Chile
Anisaedus rufus (Tullgren, 1905) – Argentina
Anisaedus stridulans González, 1956 – Peru

See also
 List of Palpimanidae species

References

Araneomorphae genera
Palpimanidae
Spiders of Africa
Spiders of South America